Philip Mahony (1 October 1897 – 20 April 1972) was an Irish Clann na Talmhan politician. A farmer by profession, he was elected to Dáil Éireann as a Clann na Talmhan Teachta Dála (TD) for the Kilkenny constituency at the 1943 general election. He was defeated at the 1944 general election.

References

1897 births
1972 deaths
Clann na Talmhan TDs
Members of the 11th Dáil
Politicians from County Kilkenny
Irish farmers